Fortune Global Forum is an annual conference held by Fortune magazine. The first conference was held in Singapore in 1995. The Fortune Global Forum convenes the presidents, chairmen, CEOs of the world's top companies and also prestigious economists.

The latest forum will take place in Guangzhou, China in Dec, 2017. The topic is "Openness and Innovation: Shaping the Global Economy".

References

External links 
 

Fortune (magazine)